Port Chester is a village in the U.S. state of New York and the largest part of the town of Rye in Westchester County by population. At the 2010 U.S. census, the village of Port Chester had a population of 28,967 and was the fifth-most populous village in New York State. In 2019, its population grew to a census-estimated 29,342 residents. Located in southeast Westchester, Port Chester forms part of the New York City metropolitan statistical area. Port Chester borders the state of Connecticut and the town of Greenwich to the east. Port Chester is one of only 12 villages in New York still incorporated under a charter; other villages either incorporated or reincorporated under the provisions of Village Law.

The village of Port Chester is nicknamed the "Gateway to New England" and serves as a transportation hub between New England states and New York. Its economy is primarily stimulated by small businesses, the local government, and several national chain stores, including Stop & Shop, Marshalls, Target, T-Mobile and Metro by T-Mobile, Verizon, Boost Mobile, Staples, and Walgreens.

Etymology
The land on which the village was founded was originally known as Haseco by the Wappinger people, meaning "marshy land" or "marshy hassock". Upon colonial settlement, the area became known as Saw Pit (or Sawpits) for the saw pits in use during the time. Logs were cut in holes in the ground for wood to be used for homesteading. The name Saw Pit was used for the first time in 1732. The village eventually outgrew this name and became Port Chester by incorporating as a village in 1868.

History

In 1660, three settlers from Greenwidge (now Greenwich, Connecticut) — Thomas Studwell, John Coe, and Peter Disbrow — arranged to buy Manursing Island and the land near the Byram River from the Native Americans. This First Purchase on Peningo Neck comprised the lower part of the present town of Rye, on the east side of Blind Brook. Over the course of the next decade, additional purchases filled in the shoreline from Rye to Greenwich, made via land agreements with the Native Americans in the area at that time. The tribal affiliation of these Native Americans has been a source of considerable debate. They may have been small, independent families or tribes, or they may have been sub-groups of larger tribes in the area. What is known, and documented, is the names of the natives who signed land agreements. Their names were written by the English, using their semi-skilled interpretation of the phonetics. In spite of the English phonetic variations, the  land records still existent were clearly signed by the same individuals:

Shawanórõckquot aka Shanarockwell aka Shanarocke (and other variations)

Cockho aka Cokow aka Cokeo (and other variations)

Cockinsecawa aka Cokinseco aka Cockenseco  (and other variations)

Kamaque aka Quaraiko aka Rawmanquaie (and other variations)

Mehúmõw aka Maowbert

It is Shanarocke who the others referred to as their leader or "Sachem". These elder tribe members or "sagamores" made many of the tribal decisions, and there were several instances where agreements could not be signed because he was not present. Shanarocke was a Wiechquaeskeck Native American. Wiechquaskeck settlements were well-documented in shore areas from present-day Pelham to the Byram or "Armonk" river on the Connecticut state line. Indeed, Shanarocke is specifically named a "Wiechquaskeck sachem" or is titled "Sachem of Poningoe" on deeds that included portions of the Bronx and Harlem River area, as well as portions of Queens and Nassau County.

"No Indian name more frequently occurs in the history of the county than that of Wechquaesgeek, nor one the precise location of which there is more difficulty in determining.  O'Callaghan says:  'This tract is described as extending from the Hudson to the East river.  The name is from wigwos, birch bark, and keag, country -- 'the country of the birch bark.'  Bolton gives the name to an Indian village which occupied the site of Dobbs' ferry, which he denominates 'the place of the bark kettle.'  In Albany Records, III, 379, is this entry:  'Personally appeared Sauwenare, sachem of Wieckqueskeck, Amenameck his brother, and others, all owners, etc., of lands situated on North river called Wieckquaeskeck, and declared that they had sold the same to Wouter Van Twiller in 1645" Source:  Ruttenber, Edward Manning, History of the Indian Tribes of Hudson's River:  Their Origin, Manners and Customs; Tribal and Sub-Tribal Organizations; Wars, Treaties, Etc., Etc., p. 366 (Albany, NY:  J. Munsell, 1872). 

Wechqueskeck is not the name of a particular Native American tribe. It was the name applied to the territorial jurisdiction of a clan of Indians in Westchester County, whose principal village was on the headwaters or tributaries of Armonck or Byram's River. Ruttenber.  Indian Geographical Names, pp. 24–25, in 'Proceedings' of New York State Hist. Association, vol. 6; Beauchamp.  Aboriginal Place Names of New York.  Albany, 1907, p. 256."] It is perhaps the later treaties at West Farms and Hunts Point, where Shanarocke is labeled "Sachem of Rye", that his tribal affiliation can be surmised. On that agreement are also the sachems of the Reckgawawancs. Recent investigation points to affiliations with the Wappingers, Lenape, Mohawk, Mohegan, and other Westchester County natives. But Native Americans continued to live in Sawpit until their presence was considered a nuisance, a fate that fell on many Native Americans.

Saw Pit area remained largely untouched until Revolutionary times except for a few farms in the hills above the Byram River, and a few taverns along the trail that became the Boston Post Road. Although Rye and Saw Pit were created within Fairfield County, Connecticut, the King of England gifted the Duke of York with large territories west of present-day Connecticut, forming the New York Colony in 1683. The controversy of divided loyalties to the King or the Duke prevailed for 105 years. In 1788, the Legislature of New York ruled that Saw Pit was a part of the town of Rye, New York. Families from Rye and Greenwich began to settle the Saw Pit area just prior to the Revolution but even as late as 1800 there were only a handful of established homesteads.

Early roads in the area grew from native trails. The Boston Post Road, King Street, and Grace Church streets are some of the early migration paths in the Saw Pit/Rye settlement. Water transportation was equally important. The local waterways (the Byram River and Long Island Sound) were a key part of the growth and development of Saw Pit/Port Chester. Early residents took part in farming and fishing. After the Revolution, the harbor area became a shipbuilding site, with the Lyon family operating a considerable shipyard that produced some of the best sloops and ocean-going fishing vessels of the time. By the time the village of Saw Pit was incorporated as Port Chester, it was considered a major seaport. The Byram river provided a decent harbor which would become a factor in the industrialization of Port Chester at the beginning of the 19th century. The arrival of the rail road in 1849 turned Port Chester into a destination for manufacturing and wealthy NYC families, with hotels, theaters, and large estates. These exclusive properties included some of the grandest mansions on the East Coast, but slowly gave way to the crushing need for housing. Successive waves of immigrants from Germany, Ireland, and Italy each brought industry and prosperity as the Village grew.

Steamships regularly sailed from Port Chester to New York City from 1870 until the First World War. The last two decades of the nineteenth century saw public services expand, and roads were widened and paved in the 1920s. From the first and second world wars, over 5,000 men from Port Chester served. After the Second World War, numerous corporations established headquarters or production centers in Port Chester. Examples include Life Savers, whose former factory is now a residential building, which is evidence of Port Chester's progression from an industrial center to a suburban residential municipality.

On June 30, 1974 an infamous nightclub fire killed 24 young men and women. The fire at Gulliver's was the deadliest dance club fire in the United States in more than a generation (the Cocoanut Grove fire in Boston, on November 28, 1942, had killed 491, and the Happy Land fire in the Bronx, on March 25, 1990, was to kill 87), and it called attention to the dangers of herding young people into windowless underground rooms without smoke alarms, sprinklers, fire-resistant walls, or limits on occupancy.

Despite the tragedy of Gulliver's, comprehensive New York State Fire Code reform would not be seen until the 1980s. Fire code enforcement continues to be a top priority in Port Chester to this day.

In 1999, the village of Port Chester established a "redevelopment area" and relegated regulatory authority within that area to private developer Gregory Wasser (from G&S Port Chester, LLC), including power to condemn private property. The decision has spawned several lawsuits, including Brody v. Village of Port Chester, Edward Eways v. Village of Port Chester, and Didden v. Village of Port Chester.

Since the late twentieth and early twenty-first century, Port Chester has undergone several redevelopment proposals and projects. The Port Chester Historical Society is a dedicated group of community members dedicated to learning and teaching the public about Port Chester local history.

Geography

Port Chester has a humid subtropical climate (Cfa). Due to its location on the coast, temperatures are neither extremely cold nor warm, and precipitation is plentiful for the entire year. Winters are usually cool, and powerful nor'easters can occur, sometimes dropping large amounts of rain and snow on the village. Average annual snowfall is 29.8 inches, which is significantly more than New York City's 25.3 average inches. Snow cover is sporadic as the sea moderates temperatures, which melt snow. During the summer, Port Chester is typically warm, however is far cooler than towns even a few miles inland due to the moderating influence of the sea.

Demographics

At the 2019 American Community Survey, there were 29,342 people living in the village of Port Chester. The racial and ethnic makeup of Port Chester in 2019 was 30.6% non-Hispanic white, 3.0% Black or African American, 1.7% Asian, 0.3% some other race, 0.3% two or more races, and 63.9% Hispanic or Latin American of any race. Of the Hispanic and Latino population, the largest single group were Mexican Americans (14.4%) and other Hispanics and Latin Americans made up 45.0% of the demographic. At the 2020 American Community Survey, the Latino population was 14.1% Mexican, 11.8% Guatemalan, 10.3% Ecuadorian, 7.3% Peruvian, 3.7% Dominican, 3.4% Colombian.

At the census of 2010, there were 28,967 people, 9,240 households, and 6,348 families residing in the village. The population density was 11,722.5 people per square mile (4,526.1/km2). There were 10,046 housing units at an average density of 4,185.8 per square mile (1,646.9/km2). The racial makeup of the village was 31.6% White, 5.3% African American, 0.2% Native American, 2.0% Asian, 0.0% Pacific Islander, 0.7% some other race, and 0.9% from two or more races. Hispanic or Latino of any race were 59.4% of the population.

There were 9,240 households, out of which 33.9% had children under the age of 18 living with them, 46.5% were headed by married couples living together, 14.3% had a female householder with no husband present, and 31.3% were non-families. 24.2% of all households were made up of individuals, and 10.0% had someone living alone who was 65 years of age or older. The average household size was 3.08 and the average family size was 3.54.

In the village the population was spread out, with 22.6% under the age of 18, 9.6% from 18 to 24, 34.2% from 25 to 44, 22.7% from 45 to 64, and 10.6% who were 65 years of age or older. The median age was 34.4 years. For every 100 females, there were 110.3 males. For every 100 females age 18 and over, there were 111.4 males.

At the 2000 U.S. census, the median income for a household in the village was $45,381, and the median income for a family was $51,025. Males had a median income of $32,848 versus $32,461 for females. About 10.1% of families and 13.0% of the population were below the poverty line, including 15.3% of those under age 18 and 12.6% of those age 65 or over. In 2019, the median income for a household in Port Chester was $74,920 and the mean income was $99,001.

Port Chester contains a more diverse, working-class population than many of its surrounding communities. The population of Port Chester is also a relatively religious suburban community in Downstate New York. The largest religious group in the village and area is Christianity, dominated by the Roman Catholic Church (47%). Of the Christian community, the second largest group operating in the village is the United Methodist Church (1.8%) and the third largest were Baptists (1.7%). The second largest religion in Port Chester was Judaism as of 2021 (5.2%), and Islam was the third largest single religious group (1.5%).

Economy
The Life Savers Candy Company operated a factory in Port Chester from 1920 until 1984. The factory building, which now contains apartments, is one of Port Chester's prominent landmarks. National Collector's Mint was headquartered in Port Chester, and Port Chester is the home of the chili restaurant Pat's Hubba Hubba (also known as "Hubba's").

Business

American Automotive Equipment (1969)

Education 
Within the village's borders, there is one public school district, the Port Chester-Rye Union Free School District. Established in 1884, it is the oldest school district in Westchester County. Two notable schools in Port Chester are Port Chester Middle and Port Chester High School.

At one time the Westchester Fairfield Hebrew Academy (now Carmel Academy) was in Port Chester. It opened in Port Chester in 1997, in rented space.

The Japanese Weekend School of New York, a hoshū jugyō kō (Japanese weekend school), holds classes at Port Chester Middle School. As of 2006, the school had about 800 students, including Japanese citizens and Japanese Americans, at locations in Westchester County and Long Island.

Arts and culture 
The Port Chester-Rye Brook Public Library is an association library funded by and for the villages of Port Chester and Rye Brook. The library was founded in 1876 by the Honorable Jared V. Peck and was dedicated at its present location in 1926 at the intersection of Haseco and Westchester Avenues. Three major renovations have taken place over the years: 1967, 2007 and 2012. The latest renovation included the creation of a teen room, a multipurpose meeting room, the addition of new furniture and carpets, and the relocation of the children's room and the implementation of an elevator. Although the renovation did not add square footage to the original three-story, 18,900 square foot building, it did provide a more open design with better use of space and light to promote parent and child reading activities. The 2012 renovations which cost $1M dollars were paid with the kind bequest of the late Douglas and Elise Lefferts.
According to 2011 records; 19,900 people hold library cards, and 10,221 people attended programs including GED and community interest classes. The summer reading program typically draws 13,000 children.

Another notable cultural landmark in Port Chester is the Capitol Theatre, a historic music venue that has hosted bands and artists such as The Grateful Dead, Janis Joplin, The Rolling Stones, David Bowie, Bob Dylan, The Ramones, and many more. Jerry Garcia of The Grateful Dead was quoted as saying, "There's only two theaters, man... that are set up pretty groovy all around for music and for smooth stage changes, good lighting and all that – the Fillmore [in Silver Spring, MD] and The Capitol Theatre." As a result of Garcia's preference for the theatre, a section of Port Chester has Grateful Dead-themed adornments on sidewalks, telephone poles, and in local businesses. Janis Joplin also wrote her song "Mercedes Benz" outside the Capitol Theatre.

Government and politics

Port Chester's government comprises a mayor and seven trustees. The board and mayor also employ a professional village manager. The current mayor of Port Chester is Luis Marino (D).

Board of Trustees 
Daniel Brakewood (D)
Frank Ferrara (D)
Joan Grangenois-Thomas (D)
Bart Didden (C)
Alex Payan (R)

Stuart Rabin serves as village manager for Port Chester.

Local elections in Port Chester occur in March. As part of a 2009 U.S. Justice Department consent decree, Port Chester employed cumulative voting for trustee positions. The decree expired in 2016 and after exploring voting options for elections scheduled for March 2019, it adopted cumulative voting in its charter by popular referendum in October 2018. The mayor continues to be elected at large.

Voting 
To enforce the Voting Rights Act of 1965, the United States Department of Justice brought a lawsuit in 2006 to compel the village government to change from an allegedly racially discriminatory at-large electoral system to one that was district-based. This lawsuit would halt the scheduled March 2007 elections until the village develops an acceptable plan. In its December 15, 2006 complaint the Justice Department alleged that, "the current at-large system for electing members of the Port Chester Board of Trustees results in Hispanic citizens having less opportunity than white citizens to participate in the political process and to elect candidates of their choice to the Port Chester Board of Trustees." (United States v. Village of Port Chester 6 Civil 15173) Local Latino activist Cesar Ruiz, NYS Assemblyman Peter Rivera and Angelo Falcón, President of the National Institute for Latino Policy held a news conference on Martin Luther King Jr.'s birthday (January 15, 2007) to display support for the Justice Department's lawsuit and the need to reform the village's electoral system.

The Village Board of Trustees passed a resolution on December 4, 2006, expressing its disagreement with the U.S. Department of Justice's decision that the village must reform its election system, claiming that the problem was not discrimination but rather "apathy" in the Hispanic community. Federal authorities believed that the village's "at large" voting system denied Hispanics representation on the board of trustees and the board of education. According to Reuters, "All voters in town elect each board member, whereas dividing the town into six electoral districts would give Hispanics a majority in at least one of them because they are largely concentrated in one area of town, the suit said." Although Latinos make up a significant portion of Port Chester's population, no Latinos had ever been elected to their Board of Trustees or local school board.

On March 2, 2007, federal court judge Stephen C. Robinson ruled in favor of the U.S. Department of Justice and placed an injunction on the March trustee elections scheduled to take place. This ruling did not affect the mayoral election, but it was expected to result in Port Chester being broken down into election districts. Instead, village officials came up with an alternative plan to address the problem by using cumulative voting. This plan was approved by the federal judge on November 6, 2009.

U.S. Post Office
The United States Post Office (Port Chester, New York) is an historic post office building located on Westchester Avenue. It was designed by consulting architects Zoller and Muller for the Office of the Supervising Architect, built in 1932-1933, and listed on the National Register of Historic Places in 1989.

It is a one-story symmetrical building faced with brick and trimmed in limestone and granite in the Colonial Revival style. The front facade features a projecting central pavilion with a shallow portico composed of two pairs of limestone Corinthian columns echoed by Corinthian pilasters.

The lobby features an array of four large New Deal murals and nine slightly smaller lunettes, designed by Domenico Mortellito with Treasury Relief Art Project (TRAP) funding, and installed in 1936. They depict a wide range of human activities from fire fighting and ship building, to baking, iron working, medicine, music, and teaching.

Parks and recreation 
Port Chester has at least six parks, together totaling nearly :

Abendroth Park: a 10.1 acre park which includes a newly renovated section for dogs.
Columbus Park: a 9.4 acre park located east of Ryan Avenue, west of I-95, and north of Fox Island. This park has one basketball and two volleyball courts, one large and one small playground,  one picnic pavilion with picnic grills, a seasonal water spray playground, and an artificial turf soccer field. Bathroom facilities are available on-site.
Crawford Park: owned by the town of Rye. The park is used for soccer, tee-ball, and softball by the village.
Edgewood Park: a 3.2 acre park with one youth baseball field and small playground structure.
Joseph Curtis Recreation Park: a 7.5 acre park located north of the Village's downtown, not far from Lyon Park.  The park is bounded by Putnam Drive on the west, Locust Avenue on the east, and Willett Avenue from the south. The park has a small playground structure, one adult size baseball field and batting cage, one roller skating rink, and bocce courts with fencing and lighting. Bathroom facilities are available on-site.
Lyon Park: a 20.3 acre park that contains two Little League fields, a playground, and the historic Bush-Lyon Homestead. The park is bounded by Putnam Avenue, King Street, and Parkway Drive.
The Bush-Lyon Homestead, Capitol Theater, Life Savers Building, Putnam and Mellor Engine and Hose Company Firehouse, St. Peter's Episcopal Church, and United States Post Office are listed on the National Register of Historic Places.

Transportation
The Bee-Line Bus System provides bus service to Port Chester on routes 13 and 61.

Connecticut Transit Stamford Division provides bus service to Port Chester on routes 311 and 311B. The 13 was combined with the southern portion of the former 76 route on December 31, 2011.

Metro-North Railroad's Port Chester train station is located on the New Haven Line, and thus provides commuter rail service to Grand Central Terminal in New York City, and to Stamford Transportation Center and New Haven-Union Station in Connecticut.

Notable people 

 PC Chris, gamertag of Chris Szygiel, professional Super Smash Bros. Melee player. The handle PC Chris comes from his hometown of Port Chester, New York.
 John Abercrombie, jazz guitarist
 Jon Alpert, reporter and documentary filmmaker
 Lex Barker, film actor, famous for playing Tarzan
 Herman Barron (1909–1978), professional golfer
 Keter Betts, jazz double bass player
 Nick Bianco, Amateur motocross racer
 Edson Buddle, Major League Soccer player
 Jackie Carter, children's book editor and author
 William W. Cook, legal scholar and major benefactor of the University of Michigan Law School
 Paul Costa, professional football player
 Luigi Del Bianco, chief carver of Mount Rushmore
 Elliot del Borgo, composer
 Arnold Diaz, journalist for Fox 5 News
 Aaron Sabato, 2020 MLB First Round Pick by the Minnesota Twins
 Meaghan Francella, LPGA player
 George Gallo, screenwriter and filmmaker
 Arnold Gamson, conductor
 Doug Grean, musician and producer
 Adam Haslett, writer and winner of the PEN/Malamud Award
 Jean Holzworth, veterinarian
 Rob Ianello, University of Akron football coach
 E.L. Konigsburg, author, illustrator, Newbery Award winner
 Ferdinand Kramer, architect of Greyrock Park and Alden Estates 1939/1940 to 1945
 Joe Langworth, Broadway performer, choreographer and director
 Frank E. "Lank" Leonard, cartoonist and creator of the Mickey Finn comic strip
 Val Lewton, writer and producer
 Barry Lopez, writer, National Book Award winner
 Robert W. McKnight, Florida state legislator, businessman, and writer
 Terrence McNally, Playwright, librettist, and screenwriter
 Colin Moran, professional baseball player
 Andy Newmark, rock and funk drummer
 Leslie R. Nicholas, businessman and Pacific War veteran
 Richard Ogilvie, Governor of Illinois 1968-1972
 Frank Pavone, Roman Catholic priest
 Ruth Roberts, songwriter
 Saul Rosen, computer scientist
 Andre Roy, NHL player
 Rachael Sage, singer-songwriter
 Carl Schmehl, director and producer
 Ed Sullivan, entertainer
 Art Tomassetti, record-setting test pilot
 David Tutera, celebrity wedding planner
Anthony Vincent, YouTuber and musician 
 Peter J. Vita, holder of the world record for the longest working career as a barber

Sister cities
Port Chester is twinned with:
  Jingzhou, Hubei in China (2000–present)
  Portchester, Hampshire in England (2010–present)

See also 

 Mamaroneck (village), New York
 Rye Brook, New York

References

External links

 Village of Port Chester official website
 Town of Rye official website

 
Populated coastal places in New York (state)
Villages in New York (state)
Villages in Westchester County, New York